The Banner is an American hardcore punk band from Bloomfield, New Jersey.

The Banner broke up for a brief period in 2006 before reuniting with founding member Garrett DeFalco. The band released their third studio album, Frailty, in 2008, which was written,recorded and produced at the Machine Shop studio in Hoboken, New Jersey, by Joey and Will Putney and released on the Ferret Music label.

In late 2011, Born to Ruin was announced as the band's next release, written by Joey and Jeremy Comitas to be released by American label Melotov Records. The four songs comprising Born to Ruin: The Way Is Shut released in the fall of 2013.

The band released their fourth album, Greying, in 2014 and Only the Dead Know Jersey, a split with Old Wounds, in 2015. Both were released via Good Fight Music.

Members

Current members 
Joey "JSS"  Stone† – Vocals
Paul Klein (Suburban Scum, Gotham Road) – Drums
Pete August (Fleshtemple, Ankle Monitor, No) – Bass
Cindy Ward (Ankle Monitor, Tru) - Guitar 
Benny 2 Bars (Ankle Monitor, No) – Guitar
Rich Bukowski (Pharoah, Devoidov) - Guitar

Former members 
Garrett DeFalco† - guitar
Jake Blochinger - drums
Paul Klein (Suburban Scum, Gotham Road) – drums
Buzz Luciano (Pellinore) – guitar
Jeremy Comitas (Bayonet, Senses Fail) – guitar
Rich Bukowski (Pharaoh) – guitar
Kevin Manion (Pregnant)† – guitar
Jon Morozowski† – bass
Dustin Blevins – guitar
Justin Fullam (Killed by The Bull, Judas Factor) – guitar
Chris LeBoeuf (Hoover Flags, Mixtape, Father Divine) – guitar
Mike LeBoeuf (This Charming Man) – drums
Chris "Fingaz" Larsen (Suburban Scum, Banquets) – bass
Ian Mullen (The Violent Hearts, The Sun The Moon The Stars) – drums/bass
Paul Jaffre† (Shady View Terrace, The Hostage, Monument) – drums
Mikey Bats (Lager) – guitar
Rosey (hell mary) – guitar
Steve "Tree" tanis (NJDots, Low road) – bass
† Founding members of The Banner

Discography

Studio albums 
{|class="wikitable"
!Release date
!Title
!Record label
|-
| December 16, 2003
| Your Murder Mixtape
| Blackout Records
|-
| Summer 2004
| Reflection in the Shadow of the Beast (unreleased)
| Blackout Records
|-
| August 16, 2005
| Each Breath Haunted
| Ferret Music
|-
| July 10, 2008
| Frailty
| Ferret Music
|-
| December 9, 2014
| Greying
| Good Fight Music
|}

EPs 
{|class="wikitable"
!Release date
!Title
!Record label
|-
| July 2003
| Posthumous
| Blackout Records
|-
| February 2004
| Dead Wrong vs. the Banner (split with Dead Wrong)
| Warmachine Records
|-
| November 2013
| Born to Ruin I: The Way Is Shut
| Melotov Records
|-
| July 2015
| Only the Dead Know Jersey (split with Old Wounds)
| Good Fight Music
|}

Videography 
Venom and Hope
Rattlesnakes
Send Me Down

References

External links 
Official Facebook page

Metalcore musical groups from New Jersey
Musical groups established in 1999
Musical groups from New Jersey
People from Bloomfield, New Jersey
Ferret Music artists
1999 establishments in New Jersey